Eucalyptus youngiana, commonly known as large-fruited mallee, Ooldea mallee and yarldarlba, is a species of mallee, less commonly a tree, that in native to arid and semi-arid areas of southern Western Australia and South Australia. It has rough, fibrous bark on some or all of the trunk, smooth bark above, lance-shaped adult leaves, flower buds in groups of three, red, pink or bright yellow flowers and short, broad, conical fruit.

Description
It has rough, flaky, dark grey-brown bark on part or all of the trunk and smooth, pinkish-grey to creamy bark above. Flowering occurs from June to October and the flowers are red, pink or bright yellow.

Taxonomy
Eucalyptus youngiana was first formally described in 1876 by Ferdinand von Mueller in his book Fragmenta phytographiae Australiae, based on specimens collected at Queen Victoria Spring by Jess Young during the Giles expedition of May 1875. The specific epithet honours Jess Young, a member of Giles's fourth expedition, who collected the type specimen.

Distribution and habitat
The large-fruited mallee grows in sandy soil on flat country, often associated with Triodia species. It occurs throughout arid and semi-arid areas from north of Kalgoorlie in Western Australia through the Great Victoria Desert to Tarcoola and Bulgunnia Station in South Australia.

References

Flora of South Australia
Plants described in 1876
Eucalypts of Western Australia
Myrtales of Australia
youngiana
Mallees (habit)
Taxa named by Ferdinand von Mueller